John Hazel may refer to:
 John R. Hazel, American jurist and politician
 John Hazel (footballer), Scottish footballer
 Til Hazel (John Tilghman Hazel Jr.), American attorney and real-estate developer